Macaria multilineata, the many-lined angle, is a moth of the  family Geometridae. It is found from New England, New York and Ontario to Florida, west to Oklahoma and Iowa.

The wingspan is 26–28 mm. Adults are on wing from April to September. There are one to two generations per year.

The larvae feed on Chamaecyparis thyoides and Juniperus virginiana.

External links
Image
Bug Guide
Description of the Larval Stage

Macariini
Taxa named by Alpheus Spring Packard
Moths described in 1873